The Alberto da Giussano class of light cruisers were a sub-class of the  built before World War II for the Italian Regia Marina, to gain predominance in the Mediterranean Sea. They were designed by general Giuseppe Vian and were named after Condottieri (military commanders) of the Italian Mediaeval and Renaissance periods.

Between the World Wars, the world powers started a rush to gain the supremacy on the seas. To counter the French menace, the Regia Marina decided to produce a new class of cruiser that would be of intermediate size between the new French destroyer class and cruisers. The Italian ships equated to the British  cruisers.

Meant to hunt down and overwhelm the big French destroyers, the emphasis on firepower and speed resulted in these ships being virtually unprotected against gunfire and underwater threats; this was a major factor in all four ships being sunk by torpedoes.

Ships

See also
 List of ship classes of the Second World War

References

Further reading

External links

Cruiser classes